A warlock is a male practitioner of witchcraft and counterpart to a witch, a female practitioner of witchcraft.

Warlock or The Warlock may also refer to:

Books, comic books and television

Characters
 Adam Warlock, a Marvel Comics fictional cosmic being
 Warlock (Artemis Fowl), fictional magicians in the Artemis Fowl series
 Warlock (Charmed), male and female characters in the television series Charmed
 Warlock (New Mutants), a Marvel Comics fictional character who later became the amalgam Douglock
 The children of Lilith, half demon and half human, in The Mortal Instruments series
 The Warlock, a supervillain from The New Adventures of Superman

Novels
 Warlock (Cartmel novel), a Doctor Who new adventure
 Warlock (Hall novel), a 1958 western novel by Oakley Hall
 Häxmästaren or Heksemesteren (The Warlock in English), a series of books by Margit Sandemo
 Warlock (Smith novel), a 2001 novel by Wilbur Smith
 The Warlock: The Secrets of the Immortal Nicholas Flamel, a 2011 fantasy novel by Michael Scott

Other
 Warlock (magazine), a magazine for Fighting Fantasy
 "Warlock" (The Avengers), an episode of the 1960s espionage television series The Avengers

Film
 Warlock (1959 film), a western film (based on the 1958 novel of the same name)
 Warlock (1989 film), a horror film
 Warlock: The Armageddon (1993), a sequel to the 1989 horror film
 Warlock III: The End of Innocence (1999), the third installment in the Warlock horror film series

Gaming
 Warlock (Dungeons & Dragons), a character class in Dungeons & Dragons
 Warlock (video game), a 1994 video game for Sega Genesis and Super Nintendo Entertainment System
 Warlock (World of Warcraft), the name of a class in the video game World of Warcraft
 Warlock: Master of the Arcane, a 2012 turn-based strategy video game
 Warlock: The Avenger, a computer game for Amiga
 Warlock, a character class in the 2014 video game Destiny
 Warlock, a card type in Magic the Gathering

Music
 Peter Warlock (1894–1930), English composer

Groups
 Warlock (band), a German heavy metal band from Düsseldorf
 Warlocks (band), a Norwegian hip hop group
 The Warlocks, a psychedelic rock band
 The Warlocks, the original name of the American rock band Grateful Dead
 The Warlocks, the original name of the American rock band The Velvet Underground

Other music
 Warlock (guitar), a guitar model by B.C. Rich guitars
 "Warlocks" (song), a song from the 2006 album Stadium Arcadum by the Red Hot Chili Peppers

Transportation
 Warlock, renamed John G. Griffiths in 1908, a GWR 3031 Class locomotive
 Dodge Warlock, a pickup truck offered by Chrysler Corporation

Other uses 
 Warlock, Texas, an unincorporated community in the United States
 Warlock (horse), a racehorse

See also
 Warlocks Motorcycle Club (disambiguation), name used by several motorcycle gangs or clubs